The truth is out there may refer to:
A tagline for The X-Files
"The Truth Is Out There...and It Hurts", an episode of Charmed
"The Truth is Out There" (NCIS), an episode of NCIS

See also
Truth
Conspiracy theory
9/11 Truth Movement
To Tell the Truth

1993 neologisms
Quotations from television
Science fiction catchphrases